The following list of programs are broadcast by Network 10 / 10 HD in Australia, across its multi-channels 10 Peach, 10 Bold and 10 Shake, as well as regional affiliate 10 Regional and online on the catch-up streaming service 10 Play. Some affiliate stations have alternate schedules and may air programs at different times.

Currently broadcast on Network 10

Domestic

News and current affairs

Local productions
 10 News First – nightly 5pm evening bulletins produced in Sydney and Melbourne (1965–present)
 10 News First Adelaide – nightly 5pm evening bulletins produced in Sydney and Adelaide (1965–present)
 10 News First Perth – nightly 5pm evening bulletins produced in Sydney and Perth (1988–present)
National programs produced in Sydney
 10 News First Midday -12.00pm-1.00pm weekdays (2023 January 9–present)
 10 News First Weekend – 5.00pm–6.30pm weekends (1994–2011, 2012–present)
 Studio 10 – morning talk show 10.00am–12pm weekdays (2013–present)
 The Sunday Project – 6:30pm-7.30pm Sundays (2012, 2017–present)
National programs produced in Melbourne
 The Project – 6:30pm-7.30pm weeknights (2009–present)

Drama
 Five Bedrooms (2019–present)
 The Secrets She Keeps (2020 on 10, 2022–present on Paramount+)

Comedy
 Taskmaster Australia (2023–present)
 The Cheap Seats (2021–present)
 How to Stay Married (2018–present)

Variety / Entertainment
 Have You Been Paying Attention? (2013–present)
 Would I Lie to You? Australia (2022–present)

Reality
 The Amazing Race Australia (2011–2014 on Seven, 2019–present on 10)
 Australian Survivor (2002 on Nine, 2006 on Seven, 2016–present on 10)
 The Bachelor Australia (2013–present)
 The Bachelorette Australia (2015–present)
 The Challenge: Australia (2022)
 I'm a Celebrity...Get Me Out of Here! (2015–present)
 First Dates Australia (2016–2018, 2020 on Seven, 2022–present on 10)
 Hunted (2022–present)
 The Masked Singer Australia (2019–present)
 MasterChef Australia (2009–present)
 The Real Love Boat (2022–present)
 Teen Mom Australia (2020–present on 10 Shake)
 The Traitors (2022–present)

Observational / documentary
 Advancing Australia (2021–present)
 Ambulance Australia (2018–present)
 Bondi Rescue (2006–present)
 The Dog House Australia (2021–present)
 Gogglebox Australia (2015–present) (co-produced with LifeStyle)
 Mirror Mirror (2021–present)
 Territory Cops (2012 on CI, 2016, 2021–present on 10)
 Todd Sampson's Body Hack (2016–present)

Game shows
 Shaun Micallef's Brain Eisteddfod (2022–present)
 Ultimate Classroom (2022–present)

Lifestyle
 10 Minute Kitchen (2021–present)
 All 4 Adventure (2010–present)
 Australia By Design (2017–present)
 Buy to Build (2019–present)
 Escape Fishing with ET (1997–2004 on Nine, 2005–present on 10)
 Everyday Gourmet with Justine Schofield (2011–present)
 Farm to Fork (2019–present)
 Freshly Picked with Simon Toohey (2020–present)
 Good Chef Bad Chef (2006–2007 on Seven, 2011–present on TEN)
 Healthy Homes TV (2015–present)
 iFish (2009–present on 10 Bold)
 Lee Rayner's Fishing Edge (2017—present)
 Hungry (2022–present)
 Left Off The Map (2020–present)
 The Living Room (2012–present)
 Luca's Key Ingredient (2021–present)
 Luxury Escapes (2017–present)
 The Offroad Adventure Show (2013–present)
 Pat Callinan's 4x4 Adventures (2008–present)
 Pooches at Play (2017–present)
 Reel Action (2013–present)
 Roads Less Travelled (2020–present)
 Seafood Escape with Andrew Ettingshausen (2019–present)
 Snap Happy (2017–present on 10 Bold)
 Taste of Australia with Hayden Quinn (2020–present)
 Three Blue Ducks (2021–present)
 Three Veg and Meat (2020–present)
 Waltzing Jimeoin (2021)
 Well Traveller (2022–present)
 Wildlife Rescue Australia (2022–present)
 What's Up Downunder (2012–present)
 WhichCar (2019–present)

Special
Christmas with the Australian Women's Weekly (2010–2017 on Nine, 2019–present on 10)
Easter with the Australian Women's Weekly (2012–2013 on Nine, 2020–present on 10)

Sports talk
 A-Leagues All Access (2022–present)
 Melbourne Cup Carnival Preview Show (2020–present)
 Round Ball Rules (2022–present on 10 Play)

Sports

 Basketball: NBL (1992–1997, 2010–2015, 2021–present on 10 Peach)
 Formula One: Australian Grand Prix (2003–present)
 MotoGP: Australian MotoGP (1997–present)
 Horse racing: The Melbourne Cup Carnival (1978–2001, 2019–present)
 Mixed martial arts: Bellator MMA (2021–present)
 Soccer: A-League Men (2017–2019 on 10 Bold, 2021–present on 10), A-League Women (2021–2022 on 10 Bold, 2022–present on 10 Play on demand), Socceroos and Matildas internationals (2018–2019, 2021–present on 10 and 10 Bold), FFA Cup (2021–present on 10), FA Cup (2022–present on 10)

Children's (10 Shake)
 The Bureau of Magical Things (2018–present)
 Dive Club (2021–present)
 Nick News (2022–present) 
 Rock Island Mysteries (2022–present)
 Shake Takes (2020–present)

Preschool (10 Shake)
 Ready Set Dance (2020–present)

Annual events
 AACTA Awards (1985, 2002, 2013–2015, 2021–present)

Religious
 Mass For You At Home (1971–present)

Foreign

News and current affairs
 48 Hours (10 Bold)
 CBS Mornings (2007–present)

Animation (10 Shake)
 South Park (2020–present)

Soap operas
 The Bold and the Beautiful (1987–present)

Drama
 Blue Bloods
 Bull
 CSI: Vegas
 FBI 
 FBI: Most Wanted
 FBI: International
 The Gilded Age (2022–present)
 Law & Order: Special Victims Unit (2001–present)
 My Life Is Murder (2019, 2022–present)
 NCIS (2004–present)
 NCIS: Hawaiʻi
 NCIS: Los Angeles
 NCIS: New Orleans
 SEAL Team (2018–2019 on Ten, 2019–present on 10 Bold)

Comedy
 Comedy Central Roast (10 Shake)
 The Conners 
 Drunk History US (2019–2020 on 10 Peach, 2020–present on 10 Shake)
 Inside Amy Schumer (10 Shake)
 Man with a Plan (2017–2019 on 10, 2019–2020 on 10 Peach)
 Ridiculousness (10 Shake)
 Roast Battle (10 Shake)
 The Unicorn (2019 on 10, 2020–present on 10 Peach)

Variety / entertainment
 The Daily Show with Trevor Noah (10 Shake)
 Dr. Phil (2007–present)
 The Doctors (2009–2015 on 10, 2015–present on 10 Bold)
 Entertainment Tonight (2012–present)
 The Graham Norton Show (2012–present)
 Judge Judy (1997–present)
 The Late Late Show with James Corden (2015–2020 on 10 Peach, 2020–present on 10 Shake)
 The Late Show with Stephen Colbert (2015 on 10 Peach, 2015–present on Ten)
 The Talk (2012–present)
 Tosh.0 (10 Shake)

Reality
 Catfish: The TV Show (10 Shake)
 The Charlotte Show (10 Shake)
 Ex on the Beach UK (10 Shake)
 Fear Factor (10 Shake)
 Just Tattoo of Us (10 Shake)
 Lip Sync Battle (2020–present on 10 Shake)
 The Masked Singer USA
 Pimp My Ride (10 Shake)
 Posh Frock Shop (10 Peach)
 Teen Mom USA (2020–present on 10 Shake)
 Undercover Boss (10 Bold)

Observational / documentary
 999: What's Your Emergency? (2019–present)
 Ambulance (2017–present)
 Jamie's Ultimate Veg (2019–present)
 One Born Every Minute (2019–present)
 Underworld Histories (2019–present)

Lifestyle
 The Dog House
 Jamie Oliver's cooking shows

Children's (10 Shake)

 Breadwinners (2020–present)
 Bunsen Is a Beast (2021–present)
 The Casagrandes (2023–present)
 Game Shakers (2021–present)
 The Haunted Hathaways (2021–present)
 Henry Danger (2020–present)
 iCarly (2009–16, 2020–present)
 It's Pony (2023–present)
 The Loud House (2020–present)
 Nicky, Ricky, Dicky & Dawn (2020–present)
 Sam & Cat (2020–present)
 Sanjay and Craig (2016–19, 2020–present)
 SpongeBob SquarePants (2002–13, 2020–present)
 Star Trek: Prodigy (2022–present)
 The Thundermans (2020–present)
 T.U.F.F. Puppy (2022–present)
 Victorious (2011–17, 2020–present)

Preschool (10 Shake)

 Abby Hatcher (2021–present)
 Baby Shark's Big Show! (2022–present)
 Blaze and the Monster Machines (2020–present)
 Blue's Clues & You! (2020–present)
 Bubble Guppies (2020–present)
 Butterbean's Café (2020–present)
 Corn & Peg (2021–present)
 Dora and Friends (2021–present)
 Dora the Explorer (2020–present)
 PAW Patrol (2020–present)
 Ryan's Mystery Playdate (2021–present)
 Santiago of the Seas (2022–present)
 Shimmer and Shine (2020–present)
 Team Umizoomi (2020–present)
 Top Wing (2020–present)

Annual events
 MTV Europe Music Award (2020–present on 10 Shake, shared with MTV)
 MTV Video Music Awards (2020 on 10 Peach, 2021–present on 10 Shake, shared with MTV)
 Tony Awards (2021–present on 10 Peach)

Religious
 Hour of Power
 Joel Osteen
 Joseph Prince: New Creation Church
 The Key of David
 Leading The Way with Michael Youssef
 Truth Link

Upcoming series

Domestic

2023
 Dessert Masters (reality)
 Neighbours (1986–2010, 2023– on 10, 2011–2022 on 10 Peach)
 Dogs Behaving (Very) Badly (reality)
 The First Inventors (documentary)
 Heat (drama)
 Last King of The Cross (crime/drama, Paramount+)
 Location Location Location Australia (reality, 2012–2014 on Lifestyle, 2023– on 10)
 NCIS: Sydney (drama)
 North Shore (drama)
 Paper Dolls (drama)
 Riptide (drama)
 Shark Tank (reality, 2015–2018)

In development
 Beast Keeper (children's on 10 Shake)
 Family Court Murders (working title) (documentary)

Foreign

2023
 Danger Force (children's)
 Deer Squad (preschool)
 Just Tattoo of Us USA (reality)
 Monster High (children's)
 Sunny Day (preschool)
 Ricky Zoom (preschool)
 Transformers: EarthSpark (children's)
 Tyler Perry's Young Dylan (children's)
 Valor (drama on 10 Peach)

TBA

Formerly broadcast

Domestic

News and current affairs

 6.30 with George Negus (2011)
 Alan Jones Live (1994)
 Breakfast (2012)
 The Bolt Report (2011–2015)
 Good Morning Australia (1981–1992)
 Good Morning Delhi (2010)
 Good Morning Melbourne (1981–1988)
 Good Morning Sydney (1978–1989)
 Hard Copy (1991)
 Hinch (Seven 1987–1991, moved to Ten 1992–1994)
 Meet the Press (1992–2013)
 Newsweek (1996–1998)
 Page One (1988)
 Public Eye (1988–1989)
 Revealed (2013)
 Ten Eyewitness News Early (2006–2012, 2013–2014)
 Ten Eyewitness News Late (1991–2011, 2012–2014)
 Ten Eyewitness News Morning (1994–2011, 2012, 2013–2014)
 ttn (2004–2008)
 Wake Up (2013–2014)

Drama

 Above the Law (2000–2001)
 After the Deluge (2003)
 Arcade (1980)
 Bangkok Hilton (1989)
 Bellamy (1981)
 Big Sky (1997–1999)
 Bikie Wars: Brothers in Arms (2012)
 BlackJack telemovies (2003–2007)
 Bodyline (1984)
 The Box (1974–1977)
 Breakers (1998–1999)
 Brock (2016)
 Captain James Cook (1987)
 Cop Shop (1977–1984) (reruns on 10 Peach/WIN 2016–2021)
 Carson's Law (1983–1984) (reruns on 10 Peach/WIN 2016–2021)
 Chopper Squad (1976–1979)
 The Cooks (2004–2005, co-production with UKTV)
 A Country Practice (1981–1993 on Seven, moved to Ten in 1994)
 The Cowra Breakout (1985)
 CrashBurn (2003)
 The Day of the Roses (1998)
 The Dirtwater Dynasty (1988)
 The Dismissal (1983)
 Division 4 (1969–1975) (reruns on 10 Peach/WIN 2016–2021)
 E Street (1989–1993)
 Echo Point (1995)
 Emma: Queen of the South Seas (1988)
 Emerald Falls (2008)
 The Flying Doctors (1986–1993) (reruns on 10 Peach/WIN 2016–2021)
 Go Big (2004)
 The Harp in the South (1986)
 Hawke (2010)
 Homicide (1964–1977) (reruns on 10 Peach/WIN 2016–2021)
 Heartbreak High (1993–1996, moved to ABC 1997–1999)
 Holiday Island (1981)
 Hotel Story (1977)
 Ihaka: Blunt Instrument (2001)
 The Incredible Journey of Mary Bryant (2005)
 The Informant (2008)
 Jessica (2004)
 Joanne Lees: Murder in the Outback (2007)
 Lie With Me (2021)
 The Long Arm (1970)
 Mary: The Making of a Princess (2015)
 Matlock Police (1971–1976)
 Medivac (1996–1998)
 Mirror, Mirror (1995)
 A Model Daughter: The Killing of Caroline Byrne (2009)
 Mr & Mrs Murder (2013)
 My Brother Jack (2001)
 My Brother Tom (1986)
 My Husband, My Killer (2001)
 Number 96 (1972–1977)
 Offspring (2010–2014, 2016–2017)
 The Other Side of Paradise (1992)
 Out of the Blue (2008-2009)
 Party Tricks (2014)
 Playing for Keeps (2018–2019)
 Poor Man's Orange (1987)
 Prisoner (1979–1986)
 Puberty Blues (2012, 2014)
 Punishment (1981)
 Reef Doctors (2013, Ten/Eleven)
 The Restless Years (1977-1981)
 Return to Eden (1986)
 Richmond Hill (1988)
 Rush (2008–2011)
 The Saddle Club (2001–2009) (reruns on 10 Peach/WIN 2016–2021)
 The Secret Life of Us (2001-2005)
 Secrets & Lies (2014)
 Shark's Paradise (1986)
 Sisters (2017)
 Small Claims (2004)
 Small Claims: White Wedding (2005)
 The Society Murders (2006)
 Special Squad (1984)
 State Coroner (1997–1998)
 The Surgeon (2005)
 The Sullivans (1976–1983) (reruns on 10 Peach/WIN 2016–2021)
 Sweat (1996)
 Tanamera - Lion of Singapore (1989)
 Temptation (2003, co-production with UKTV)
 Tripping Over (2006)
 Underground: The Julian Assange Story (2012)
 Vietnam (1987)
 Wake in Fright (2017)
 Waterfront (1984)
 White Collar Blue (2001–2003)
 Wonderland (2013–2015)
 The Wrong Girl (2016–2017)

Animation
 Pacific Heat (2017 on Eleven) (originally broadcast on The Comedy Channel in 2016)

Comedy

 All Aussie Adventures (2001–2002, 2004, 2018)
 Are You Being Served? (1980–1981)
 The B Team (2005)
 Bingles (1992–1993)
 Col'n Carpenter (1990–1991)
 The Comedy Company (1988–1990)
 Darren & Brose (2015 on One)
 Die On Your Feet (2014 on One)
 Drunk History Australia (2018–2020)
 Totally Full Frontal (1998–1999)
 Good News World (2011)
 Kenny's World (2008)
 Kinne Tonight (Pilot 2018, 2019–2020)
 Late for School (1992)
 Let the Blood Run Free (1990–1994)
 Mark Loves Sharon (2008)
 Melbourne International Comedy Festival specials (1998–2016, Now on ABC)
 Micro Nation (2012 on Eleven)
 Mikey, Pubs and Beer Nuts (2000)
 Mr. Black (2019)
 Ratbags (1981)
 Real Stories (2006)
 The Ronnie Johns Half Hour (2005–2006)
 Russell Coight's Celebrity Challenge (2004)
 Sit Down, Shut Up (2001)
 skitHOUSE (2003–2004)
 Street Smart (2018)
 The Wedge (2006–2007)

Variety / entertainment

 9am with David & Kim (2006-2009)
 After Noon (1985)
 AXN (1999)
 Beauty and the Beast (1963-1970 on Seven, 1982-2002 on Ten, moved to Foxtel 2005-2007)
 The Big Night In with John Foreman (2005-2006)
 Can of Worms (2011-2013)
 Candid Camera (1989-1990)
 Chris & Julia's Sunday Night Takeaway (2019)
 The Circle (2010-2012)
 Couch Time (2011–2017 on Eleven)
 David Tench Tonight (2006)
 Dita (1967-1970)
 Download (2007-2008)
 GNW Night Lite (1999)
 Good Morning Australia with Bert Newton (1992-2005)
 Good News Week (1996-1998 on ABC, moved to Ten in 1999–2000, 2008–2012)
 Hamish & Andy Re-Gifted (2008-2010)
 Hamish & Andy's Caravan of Courage (2007-2010, moved to Nine 2012)
 His and Hers (1971-1972)
 Hughesy, We Have a Problem (2018–2020)
 John Laws - In One Lifetime (1998)
 Late Night Australia (1988)
 A League of Their Own (2013)
 Learn India with Hamish & Andy (2010)
 Live at the Chapel (1999-2006)
 The Mike Walsh Show (1973-1976, moved to Nine 1977-1984)
 Monday to Friday (1996)
 Movie Juice (2014-2015)
 New Faces (Nine 1963–1985, 1989–1990, moved to Ten 1991-1993)
 Noel and Mary (1967)
 The Panel (1998-2004)
 The Panel Christmas Wrap (2003-2007)
 Parkinson in Australia (1979-1982)
 Pets Behaving Badly (2000-2001)
 Pilot Week (2018–2022)
 Pilot Week (2018), including Bring Back Saturday Night, Trial By Kyle, Taboo, Drunk History, Kinne Tonight, Disgrace!, Dave and Skit Happens
 Pilot Week Season 2 (2019), including Part Time Privates, Sydney's Crazy Rich Asians, I Am...Roxy! and My 80 Year Old Flatmate
 Pilot Showcase (2022), including Courtney's Closet, Dinner Guest, The Love Experiment, The Bush Blonde vs The World, Time to Die and Abbie Chats
 Rove (1999 on Nine, moved to Ten 2000-2009)
 Saturday Night Rove (2019)
 Say It with Music (1967-1969)
 Shaun Micallef's New Year's Rave (2009)
 Show Me the Movie! (2018–2019)
 The Spearman Experiment (2009)
 Talkin' 'Bout Your Generation (2009-2012)
 Talkin' To Kids with Don Lane (1987)
 Taboo (2018–2019)
 Thank God You're Here (2006-2007, moved to Seven 2009)
 This Week Live (2013)
 Til Ten (1989-1991)
 Trial By Kyle (2018–2019)
 Unreal Ads (2000)
 Unreal Stuff Ups (2001)
 Unreal TV (1999-2001)
 Whose Line Is It Anyway? Australia (2017; originally broadcast on The Comedy Channel in 2016)
 Young Talent Time (1971-1988, 2012)
 You've Got To Be Joking (1987)
 Where the Action Is

Lifestyle

 The 48 Hour Destination (2017–2018)
 Aerobics Oz Style (1982-2005)
 Behind the Sash (2019)
 Ben's Menu (2014–2016)
 Blokesworld (2004-2005)
 Boys Weekend (2004)
 Bright Ideas (1997-2005)
 The Cook's Pantry with Matt Sinclair (2017)
 Cruise Mode (2016–2017)
 Everyday Health (2016)
 Foodie Adventures with Ash Pollard (2018)
 Far Flung with Gary Mehigan (2015)
 Healthy, Wealthy and Wise (1992-1998)
 The Home Team (2015–2016)
 Huey's Cooking Adventures (1997 on Seven, moved to Ten 1998-2010)
 Huey's Kitchen (2010-2014)
 Let's Do Coffee (2015)
 Love to Share (2012-2013)
 Miguel's Feasts (2014-2015)
 My Market Kitchen (2016)
 Personal Touch (1966)
 Photo Number 6 (2018)
 The Renovation King (2015)
 Sammy and Bella's Kitchen Rescue (2017)
 Sex/Life (1994-1998)
 The Rovers (1969-1970)
 Travels with the Bondi Vet (2015)
 Weekend Feast (2016)
 Yes Chef (2012)

Reality

 The $20 Challenge (2001)
 Aussie Queer Eye for the Straight Guy (2005)
 Australian Idol (2003-2009)
 Australian Princess (2005-2007)
 Bachelor in Paradise Australia (2018–2020)
 The Band
 Big Brother (2001-2008, moved to Nine 2012-2014)
 The Biggest Loser (2006–2015, 2017)
 CCTV (2000)
 Celebrity Big Brother (2002)
 Celebrity Dog School (2007)
 Changing Rooms (1998-2005 on Nine, 2019 on 10)
 Come Date with Me (2013-2014 on Eleven)
 Dancing with the Stars (2004–2015 on Seven, 2019–2020 on 10)
 Don't Tell the Bride (2012)
 Everybody Dance Now (2012)
 The Fugitive (2001)
 Get Me Out of Here, Now! (2016 on Eleven)
 Girlband (2006)
 The Hot House (2004)
 House From Hell (1998)
 I Will Survive (2012)
 Inside Idol (2003-2005)
 Making It Australia (2021)
 MasterChef Australia All-Stars (2012)
 MasterChef Australia: The Professionals (2013)
 Recipe to Riches (2013-2014)
 The Renovators (2011)
 The Resort (2004)
 Scream Test (2001)
 Search for a Supermodel (2000-2002)
 So You Think You Can Dance Australia (2008-2010, 2014)
 Undercover Boss Australia (2010-2011)
 Unreal TV (1999-2001)
 The X Factor (2005, moved to Seven 2010-2016)
 Yasmin's Getting Married (2006)

Observational / documentary

 Advancing Australia (2021)
 Being Lara Bingle (2012)
 Beyond 2000 (1993-1995, 1999)
 Bondi Ink Tattoo (2015 on Eleven)
 Bondi Rescue: Bali (2008)
 Bondi Vet (2009–2016)
 Class Of... (2012)
 Common Sense Australia (2017) (co-produced with LifeStyle)
 Cool Aid: The National Carbon Test (2005)
 Croc Files (1999-2001)
 The Crocodile Hunter (1997-2004)
 The Crocodile Hunter Diaries (2002-2004)
 Girlband (2006)
 Gold Coast Cops (2014-2015)
 Guerrilla Gardeners (2009)
 Honey, We're Killing the Kids (2006)
 Jamie's Kitchen Australia (2006)
 Keeping Up with the Joneses (2010-2011)
 Long Lost Family (2016)
 One Born Every Minute Australia (2019)
 Recruits (2009-2010)
 Recruits: Paramedics (2011)
 Saving Babies (2007)
 Saving Kids (2008)
 The Secret Life of 4 Year Olds (2018)
 The Shire (2012)
 The Steph Show (2006)
 Steve Irwin's Wildlife Warriors (2012-2013)
 Teen Fit Camp (2007)
 The Truth Is (2013)
 Wanted (2013)

Game shows

 All Star Family Feud (2016–2018)
 Are You Smarter Than a 5th Grader? (2007-2009)
 Australia's Brainiest specials (2005)
 Australia's Brainiest Kid (2004 on Seven, moved to Ten in 2005)
 Battle of the Sexes (1998)
 Blankety Blanks (1977-1978, moved to Nine 1985-1986 and 1996)
 Blind Date (1991, 2018)
 Casino 10 (1975-1977)
 The Celebrity Game (1969 on Nine, 1976-1977 on Ten)
 Celebrity Name Game (2019–2020)
 Celebrity Squares (1967, moved to Nine 1975-1976)
 The Con Test (2007)
 The Cube (2021)
 The Daryl and Ossie Show (1978)
 Double Dare (1989-1992)
 Family Double Dare (1989)
 Family Feud (2014–2018, 2020)
 The Family Game (1967)
 Friday Night Games (2006)
 Game of Games (2018)
 The Generation Gap (1969)
 Get the Message (1971-1972)
 The Gong Show (1976)
 The Great Australian Spelling Bee (2015-2016 on Ten, 2016 on Eleven)
 The Great TV Game Show (1989)
 Greed (2001)
 I Do I Do (1996)
 It's Academic (1968–1969, later moved to Seven)
 It's a Knockout (1985-1987, 2011)
 Jeopardy! (1993)
 Joker Poker (2005-2006)
 Long Play (1977)
 The Marriage Game (1966-1972)
 Match Game (1960s)
 Mind Twist (1992-1993)
 Moment of Truth (2001)
 Money Makers (1971-1973, 1982)
 The Newlywed Game (1968, moved to Nine 1987)
 Off to the Races (1967-1969)
 Perfect Match (1984-1989, moved to Seven 2002)
 Personality Squares (1967-1969, 1981)
 Playcards (1969)
 Pointless (2018–2019)
 Pot Luck (1987)
 Pot of Gold (1975-1978)
 The Price Is Right (1973–1974, 1989)
 Pyramid Challenge (1978)
 A Question of Sport (1995-1996)
 Ready Steady Cook (2005-2013)
 Search for a Star (1970–1971, 1981)
 Second Chance (1977)
 Showcase (1965–1970, 1973–1974, 1978)
 Split Personality (1967)
 Star Search (1985-1986, 1991)
 Superquiz (1989)
 Surprise! Surprise! (1972)
 Take A Letter (1967)
 Taken Out (2008)
 Tell The Truth (Nine 1959–1965, moved to Ten 1971-1972)
 Treasure Hunt (1977-1978)
 The Up-Late Game Show (2005-2006)
 You're A Star (1982)

Children's

 Andrew Daddo Presents... (1987)
 Andrew Daddo's Cartoon Show (1987)
 Animalia (2007–10)
 Baby Animals In Our World (2016–18)
 The Barefoot Bandits (2016–20)
 The Big Breakfast (1992–95)
 The Big Cheez (1998–2005)
 Cartoon Capers (1985–87)
 The Children's Show (1964)
 Cheez TV (1995–2005)
 Crash the Bash (2016–18)
 Cybergirl (2001–02)
 Dex Hamilton: Alien Entomologist (2008–12)
 The Digswell Dog Show (1996)
 The Early Bird Show (1985–89)
 The Elephant Princess (2008–09, 2011–14)
 Faireez (2005–08)
 Fergus McPhail (2004)
 The Finder (1991)
 For Real! (2020)
 Fredd Bear's Breakfast-A-Go-Go (1969–72)
 Gamify (2019–2020)
 Get Ace (2014–18)
 Guinevere Jones (2002)
 H2O: Just Add Water (2006–14)
 The Henderson Kids (1985–87)
 Horace and Tina (2001–02)
 I Got a Rocket (2006–09)
 It's Academic (1968–69, later moved to Seven)
 Jar Dwellers SOS (2013–20)
 K-9 (2010–12)
 Kelly (1991)
 Ketchup: Cats Who Cook (1998–2000, later aired on Nine)
 Kids Company (1988–92 in Perth only)
 Kids' Stuff (1991–93)
 Kuu Kuu Harajuku (2015–20)
 Lexi & Lottie: Trusty Twin Detectives (2016–18)
 Lightning Point (2012–14)
 The Lost Islands (1976)
 Mako: Island of Secrets (2013–18)
 Me and My Monsters (2010–14)
 The Miraculous Mellops (1991–93)
 Mirror, Mirror (1995)
 Mission Top Secret (1994–95)
 The New Adventures of Ocean Girl (2000)
 Ocean Girl (1994–97)
 Ocean Star (2003)
 Off the Dish (1986)
 Once Upon a Dream (2012–13)
 Outback 8 (2008–10)
 Pearlie (2009, 2011–12)
 Pirate Islands (2003, 2007–10)
 Quimbo's Quest (2019–20)
 Random and Whacky (2017–20)
 Ridgey Didge (1987-1989)
 The Rovers (1969–70)
 Sam Fox: Extreme Adventures (2014–18)
 Scooter: Secret Agent (2005)
 Scope (2005–20)
 Sherazade: The Untold Stories (2017–20)
 SheZow (2012–15)
 The Shorn Sheep Show (1992)
 Simon Townsend's Wonder World (1979–86)
 Sumo Mouse (originally aired on ABC3)
 The Toothbrush Family (1998–99, later aired on Nine)
 Thunderstone (1999–2001)
 Toasted TV (2005–20)
 Totally Wild (1992–2021)
 ttn (2004–08)
 Vic the Viking (2013–17, moved to ABC ME)
 Wicked Science (2004–06)
 Where You Find the Ladybird (1996)
 Wormwood (2007–08, 2010)
 Worst Best Friends (2002)
 Yakkity Yak (2003, later aired on ABC, ABC1 and ABC3)

Preschool
 Crocamole (2016–2021)
 Fat Cat and Friends (1972–1987 in Adelaide)
 Hi-5 House (2014–2015)
 In the Box (1998–2006)
 Mulligrubs (1988–1996)
 The Music Shop (1996–1998)
 Puzzle Play (2006–2011)
 Rock It! (2007)
 Wurrawhy (2011–2016)

Music

 Airplay (in Perth only)
 The Go!! Show (1964-1967)
 Ground Zero (1997-2001)
 The House of Hits (2000)
 The Loop (2012–2020 on 10 Peach)
 Music Video (1983-1987)
 Nightmoves (1984-1986)
 Night Shift (1987-1989)
 Pepsi Live (2001-2003)
 Say it with Music (1967-1969)
 Take 40 Australia (1993-2009)
 Uptight (1967-1969)
 Video Hits (1987-2011)
 Where The Action Is (1967)
 Work (1982)

Sports talk

 Back Page (simulcast with Fox Sports 2017 on One)
 Before the Game (2003-2013)
 Beyond the Boundary (2006)
 Drivetime TV (2001–2005 in Perth only)
 The Fifth Quarter (2004-2011)
 The Final Siren (2011 on One)
 The Game Plan (AFL) (2011-2012 on One)
 The Game Plan (NRL) (2011-2013 on Ten and One)
 Good Morning Delhi (2010)
 Inside Sport
 Just for Kicks (simulcast with Fox Sports 2017 on One)
 Late Night League (NRL) (1989-1991)
 MVP (2010 on One)
 Sochi Live (2014)
 One Week at a Time (AFL) (2009-2011 on One)
 One Week at a Time (NRL) (2011 on One)
 Overtime (2010-2011 on One)
 The Pro Shop (2009-2010 on One)
 RPM (1997-2008, 2011, 2015–2020)
 Seriously AFL
 Simply Footy (2002-2011 in Adelaide only)
 Sports Tonight (1993–2011, 2018–2019)
 Sportsweek (1991)
 Teams on 10 (2020–2021 on 10 Play)
 Thursday Night Live (2009-2010 on One)
 The Thursday Night Sport Show (2014 on One)
 The Western Front (2002-2011 in Perth only)
 Trackside
 World Football News (2010 on One)

Sports

 Australian rules football: AFL including AFL Grand Final (2002–2011)
 Commonwealth Games: Victoria 1994, Delhi 2010, Glasgow 2014
 Cricket: KFC Big Bash League (2013–2018) and Rebel Women's Big Bash League (2015–2018)
 Formula One: International races (2003–2017)
 MotoGP International races (1997–2021)
 Netball: ANZ Championship (2008-2012, 2015–2016) and INF Netball World Cup (1999, 2011, 2015)
 Rugby league: NSW Premiership (1983-1991), Amco Cup (1974-1991)
 Rugby Union: Super 10 (1993-1995), Wallabies internationals, including Bledisloe Cup and The Rugby Championship (1992–1995, 2013–2020) and Rugby World Cup (1995, 2007, 2019)
 Virgin Australia Supercars Championship including Bathurst 1000 (1997–2006, 2015–2020)
 Summer Olympic Games: Los Angeles 1984, Seoul 1988
 Swimming: Australian Swimming Championships (2009-2015) and Pan Pacific Swimming Championships (2010-2015)
 Winter Olympic Games: Sochi 2014
 Yachting: Sydney to Hobart Yacht Race (1980s-2004)

Special
 50 Years Young (2014)
 Australia Unites: Reach Out To Asia (shared with Seven & Nine)
 Seriously 40 (2005)

Annual events

 ARIA Music Awards (1992–2000, 2002–2008, 2010, 2014–2016, now on Nine)
 Australia Day Live Concert (2004-2008)
 Australia Day Concert: Live at the Sydney Opera House (2016–2018, Now on ABC)
 Carols in the City (2008–2013, now on Nine in Brisbane only)
 Logie Awards (1981, 1983, 1985, 1987, 1990, 1993, now on Seven)
 Sydney New Year's Eve Fireworks (2006–2009, now on ABC)
 Tropfest (previously on Nine, 2007-2010 on Movie Extra, 2011–2013 on SBS, 2014–2016 on SBS2, 2017 on Eleven, now on ABC Comedy)

Religious
 Enjoying Everyday Life With Joyce Meyer

Foreign, prior to the 2017 CBS takeover

News and current affairs

 The CBS Early Show
 CBS This Morning
 E! News (now on E!)
 Fast Track
 Sightings
 NBC Today (now on Seven)

Soap opera

 2000 Malibu Road
 All My Children
 Another World
 As the World Turns
 Dallas (1978-1991 series)
 Emergency – Ward 10
 General Hospital
 Glitter
 Malibu Shores
 Melrose Place
 One Life to Live
 Peyton Place
 Ryan's Hope
 Santa Barbara
 Sunset Beach
 Texas

Western

 Black Saddle
 Bonanza
 Broken Arrow
 Fury
 Gunsmoke
 Laredo
 Maverick
 The Rifleman
 Sky King
 The Texan
 The Westerner

Animation

 Beavis and Butt-Head 
 Bob's Burgers (Season 1–7, 2011–2017 on ELEVEN, now on Fox8)
 BoJack Horseman (2020–2021 on 10 Shake)
 Bordertown (ELEVEN)
 Celebrity Deathmatch
 The Cleveland Show (2009–10 on 10, 2011–13 on Eleven, 2020 on 10 Shake, now on 7flix)
 The Critic
 Dilbert
 Futurama (2005–2010, 2012–2014 on 10, 2011–2017 on ELEVEN, now on 7mate later 7flix)
 The Simpsons (Season 1–28, 1991–2011, 2012–2014 on 10, 2011–2017 on ELEVEN, later on 7mate and now 7flix)
 Son of Zorn (ELEVEN)
 Unsupervised

Drama

 24: Legacy
 24: Live Another Day
 240-Robert
 The 4400
 7th Heaven
 90210
 Adam-12
 Alfred Hitchcock Presents
 Alien Nation
 A Million Little Things
 Amazing Stories
 American Crime Story 
 American Horror Story (ELEVEN)
 American Gothic
 The Andros Targets
 Army Wives
 Automan
 Battlestar Galactica
 Baywatch (now on 9Go!)
 Baywatch Nights
 Beauty & the Beast
 Beecham House (2020 on 10 Play and Ten)
 Beverly Hills 90210
 BH90210 
 The Bionic Woman
 The Black Forest Clinic
 Blind Justice
 Breaking Point
 The Bronx Zoo
 The Buccaneers
 Buffy the Vampire Slayer
 Burke's Law
 Burn Notice
 The Byrds of Paradise
 California Fever
 Californication
 Cane
 Charlie's Angels
 Charmed (original series)
 Charmed (revival)
 Civil Wars
 Cleopatra 2525
 Code R
 Columbo
 Conviction
 Coronet Blue
 The Cosby Mysteries
 Covington Cross
 Crazy Like a Fox
 CSI: Miami 
 CSI: Cyber
 Dawson's Creek
 The Defenders
 Dexter
 Diamonds
 Doc
 Dollhouse
 Doogie Howser, M.D.
 Dragnet Today
 The Dukes of Hazzard
 The DuPont Show with June Allyson
 East Side/West Side
 Eight Is Enough
 Elementary (2013–2017, 2018–2020 on 10, 2017–2018 on 10 Bold)
 Emergency!
 Empire (ELEVEN)
 Equal Justice
 The Equalizer
 Eureka
 The Ex List
 Extant
 Extreme
 EZ Streets
 Family Law
 Fantasy Island
 The Flash (10 Peach)
 The Finder
 Flipper (1964)
 Flipper (1995)
 Flying High
 Fortune Hunter
 Footballers' Wives
 Friday Night Lights
 The Fugitive
 Gang Related
 A Gifted Man
 The Glades
 Glitter
 Go Girls
 Going to California
 The Good Wife
 Graceland
 The Greatest American Hero (later aired on ABC and Seven)
 The Greatest Show on Earth
 The Guardian
 Hack
 Hawaii Five-0 (2010–2016 on 10, 2017–2020 on 10 Bold)
 Hazell
 Harper's Island
 Highway to Heaven
 Homeland (Moved to SBS)
 Hooperman
 Hoover vs. The Kennedys
 Hope Island
 House
 In Plain Sight
 Instinct (2018—2019 on Ten)
 JAG (originally aired on Seven)
 Jane the Virgin (2016 on 10 Peach)
 Jericho
 Journeyman
 Karaoke High
 Kentucky Jones
 The Killing
 L.A. Law
 Law & Order
 Law & Order: Criminal Intent
 Law & Order: Trial By Jury (2006)
 Law & Order: UK 
 Legends
 Leg Work
 Legmen
 Lie to Me
 Life
 Life on Mars
 Limitless
 Lost in Space
 MacGyver (2016 on Ten, 2017–2021 on 10 Bold)
 Madam Secretary
 The Magician
 Magnum P.I.
 Major Crimes
 Man at the Top
 Mann & Machine
 Matt Houston
 Marcus Welby, M.D.
 Medium
 Merlin
 Miami Vice (originally aired on Nine)
 Minder (originally aired on ABC and Seven)
 Minority Report (ONE)
 The Mississippi
 Mistral's Daughter
 Moon Over Miami
 Murder, She Wrote (originally aired on Nine, later returned to air on Nine in 1998)
 Murphy's Law
 My Family and Other Animals
 M.A.N.T.I.S.
 The Net
 New York Undercover
 Northern Exposure
 Now and Again
 NUMB3RS
 Nurse Jackie
 NYC 22
 NYPD Blue
 The O.C.
 On Wings of Eagles
 One Tree Hill
 The Outer Limits
 Over There
 Party of Five
 Peak Practice
 Picket Fences
 Private Eye
 The Professionals
 PSI Factor: Chronicles of the Paranormal
 Quantum Leap
 Queens Supreme
 Ringer
 Robbery Homicide Division
 Robin's Hoods
 The Rockford Files
 Roots: The Next Generations
 The Ruth Rendell Mysteries
 Sable
 Saving Grace
 Scorpion
 SeaQuest DSV
 Seven Days
 The Shield
 Sliders
 Smallville (originally aired on Nine)
 Sons of Anarchy
 Stargate Universe
 Starman
 The Street
 Supernatural
 Surface
 Tell Me You Love Me
 Tequila and Bonetti
 Terra Nova
 The Time Tunnel
 This Is Us (2017–2018, 2020–2022 on 10, 2018 on 10 Peach)
 Those Who Kill
 Three Rivers
 Threshold
 Tommy
 Torchwood
 Touch
 Tour of Duty
 The Trials of O'Brien
 Tropical Heat
 The Twilight Zone
 TV 101
 Tyrant (repeats)
 T. J. Hooker
 Under the Dome
 University Hospital
 The Untouchables
 V (1983)
 V (1984)
 V: The Final Battle
 V.I.P.
 Veronica Mars
 WIOU
 White Collar
 Winnetka Road
 Wisdom of the Crowd
 Wolf Lake
 A Woman Called Golda
 Women's Murder Club
 Wonder Woman
 The Wonder Years
 The X-Files

Comedy

 ...And Mother Makes Three
 1600 Penn
 227
 Accidental Family
 Accidentally on Purpose
 The Addams Family
 After M*A*S*H
 Alice
 Alright Already
 Amos 'n' Andy
 Ask Harriet
 Back to You
 The Barry Humphries Show
 Batman
 Beadle's About
 Becker
 Ben and Kate
 The Benny Hill Show
 Bette
 Between Brothers
 The Beverly Hillbillies
 The Bill Dana Show
 Bizarre
 Bless This House
 The Bob Crane Show
 Boston Common
 The Brady Bunch (originally aired on Nine)
 Brush Strokes (originally aired on ABC)
 Buffalo Bill
 Butterflies (originally aired on ABC)
 Campus Cops
 Charles in Charge
 Check It Out!
 Cheers (later moved to Nine in the early 1990s)
 Coach
 Colonel Humphrey Flack
 Complete Savages
 Coupling (U.S. version)
 Courting Alex
 Crazy Ex-Girlfriend (2016–2018 on 10 Peach)
 Dads
 Dad's Army (originally aired on ABC)
 The Danny Thomas Show
 Death Valley
 The Defenders
 Delta
 Dennis the Menace (1959) (originally aired on Seven)
 Dharma & Greg (originally aired on Seven)
 Diff'rent Strokes
 Die On Your Feet
 Don't Trust the B---- in Apartment 23
 The Doris Day Show
 Dream On
 Drexell's Class
 The Dumplings
 Ed
 Ellen (originally aired on Seven)
 Enos
 Everybody Hates Chris
 Everybody Loves Raymond 
 Executive Stress (originally aired on ABC)
 The Ex List
 F Troop (originally aired on ABC)
 The Facts of Life
 The Farmer's Daughter
 Fast Times
 Fat Actress
 Father, Dear Father
 Father Knows Best
 Ffizz
 Flappers
 Flight of the Conchords
 Flo
 Fresh Off the Boat (2015–2017 on ELEVEN)
 Friends with Benefits
 Gary & Mike
 George and Mildred
 The Ghost & Mrs. Muir
 Gilligan's Island
 Glee
 Going Straight
 Going to California
 Gomer Pyle, U.S.M.C.
 The Goodies (originally aired on ABC and Seven)
 The Good Life (originally aired on ABC)
 Goodnight, Beantown
 Good Times
 Grace & Favour
 The Great Indoors (ELEVEN)
 Greetings from Tucson
 The Grinder (Eleven)
 Grosse Pointe
 The Grumbleweeds Radio Show
 Half Nelson
 Happy Together (2019 on 10 Peach)
 Harry and the Hendersons (originally aired on ABC)
 Hearts Afire
 House Calls
 House of Lies
 Hudson Street
 I Married Dora
 In-Laws
 In Living Color
 It Ain't Half Hot Mum (originally aired on ABC and Seven)
 It's All Relative
 Jake 2.0
 The Jeffersons
 The Jeff Foxworthy Show
 Julia
 Just Good Friends (originally aired on ABC)
 Just Shoot Me!
 Karen's Song
 Keep It in the Family
 The King of Kensington
 Knight and Daye
 L for Lester
 The Larry Sanders Show
 Last Man Standing
 Laugh-In
 Laurel and Hardy
 Leo & Liz in Beverly Hills
 Life in Pieces (2016–2017 on TEN)
 Little Britain USA
 The Liver Birds (originally aired on ABC)
 Love Thy Neighbour
 Love, Sidney
 Mad About You (moved to 9Gem)
 Madman of the People
 Major Dad
 Man with a Plan (2017–2019 on 10, 2019–2020 on 10 Peach)
 Maniac Mansion
 The Many Loves of Dobie Gillis
 Marblehead Manor
 Married... with Children (later moved to Nine)
 Mayberry R.F.D.
 M*A*S*H (Now on 7two)
 McHale's Navy
 The Neighborhood
 The Millers
 A Minute With Stan Hooper
 Modern Family (2010–2017, now on Seven)
 Moesha
 The Mothers-in-Law
 Mr. Terrific
 The Munsters
 The Munsters Today
 The Muppet Show (originally aired on Seven)
 Murphy Brown (Revival series)
 My Favorite Martian (originally aired on ABC)
 The Naked Truth
 The Nanny (Now on 9Go!)
 Nanny and the Professor
 Ned & Stacey
 NewsRadio
 The New Dick Van Dyke Show
 New Girl (2012-2013 on TEN, 2014–2017 on ELEVEN, Now on SBS Viceland)
 Night Court
 Night Stand with Dick Dietrick
 No Time for Sergeants
 The Odd Couple
 Odd Man Out
 The Office (now on 10 Shake)
 Only Fools and Horses
 Only When I Laugh
 Our Miss Brooks
 Out of Practice
 Out of This World
 Partners
 The Patty Duke Show
 Payne
 Plus One
 Payne
 Petticoat Junction
 The Phil Silvers Show
 Please Don't Eat the Daisies
 Private Benjamin
 Psych
 Queens Supreme
 Raising Hope
 The Real McCoys
 Robin's Nest
 Roseanne
 Rules of Engagement
 Scream Queens (ELEVEN)
 SCTV
 Seinfeld (originally aired on Nine, 1993–1999, Now on 10 Peach)
 Silver Spoons
 The Single Guy
 Sirens
 The Sketch Show
 Sledge Hammer!
 Some Mothers Do 'Ave 'Em (originally aired on ABC and Seven)
 Something So Right
 Sons of Tucson
 Square Pegs
 Stand By Your Man
 Starting from Scratch
 The Steve Harvey Show
 That Girl
 That's Life
 That's Love
 The Three Stooges
 Three's a Crowd
 Three's Company (originally aired on ABC)
 Throb
 To the Manor Born (originally aired on ABC and Seven)
 Too Close for Comfort
 Topper
 Traffic Light
 Trollied
 Uncle Buck
 The Waltons
 Wedding Band
 Weird Science
 Who's the Boss?
 Wilfred
 The Wonder Years 
 Working Girl
 Worst Week
 You Again?
 The Young Ones (originally aired on ABC)

Action and adventure

 The A-Team
 Adventures in Paradise
 The Adventures of William Tell
 Captain Gallant of the Foreign Legion
 Covington Cross
 Daniel Boone
 Hercules: The Legendary Journeys
 The Incredible Hulk
 Ivanhoe
 The Lost World
 Roar
 Scarecrow and Mrs. King
 The Six Million Dollar Man
 Switch
 Tarzan
 Tropical Heat
 The Wizard
 Wizards and Warriors
 Xena: Warrior Princess
 Zorro (1990)

Variety / entertainment

 Ant & Dec's Saturday Night Takeaway (2020–2021)
 The Black and White Minstrel Show (1964-1978)
 The Ed Sullivan Show
 The Ellen DeGeneres Show (2003-2007, later moved to Nine)
 The Garry Moore Show
 Hootenanny
 The Insider
 The Jerry Springer Show
 Judge Joe Brown
 The Larry Sanders Show
 Late Show with David Letterman (2007-2015)
 The Oprah Winfrey Show
 The Phil Donahue Show
 Ricki Lake (later moved to Seven)
 The Roseanne Show

Reality

 100% Hotter (10 Peach)
 American Idol (2002-2007, 2013–2015)
 America's Next Top Model
 Britain & Ireland's Next Top Model
 Celebrity MasterChef Australia (2009, 2021)
 Dating Naked (ELEVEN)
 Electric Dreams
 The Family
 The Glee Project
 Hell's Kitchen (ONE, Now on Seven)
 How to Look Good Naked (UK)
 How to Look Good Naked (US)
 Ice Road Truckers (now on 7mate)
 It's Me or the Dog (UK)
 I Wanna Marry "Harry"
 Junior MasterChef Australia (2010–11, 2020)
 Kid Nation
 Laguna Beach
 Mobbed
 Newlyweds: Nick & Jessica
 Oprah's Big Give
 The Osbournes
 Pimp My Ride
 Pirate Master
 Queer Eye for the Straight Guy
 Sally
 So You Think You Can Dance (now on Fox8)
 Total Wipeout UK (2020—2021 on 10 Shake)
 World's Wildest Police Videos (now on Seven)

Lifestyle

 Jamie at Home
 Jamie Does...
 Jamie Oliver's Food Revolution
 Jamie's 15-Minute Meals
 Jamie's 30-Minute Meals
 Jamie's American Road Trip
 Jamie's Chef
 Jamie's Dream School
 Jamie's Family Christmas
 Jamie's Great Britain
 Jamie's Great Italian Escape
 Jamie's Kitchen
 Jamie's Ministry of Food
 Jamie's School Dinners'''
 Jamie's Super Food Family Classic (2016)
 The Naked Chef Oliver's Twist Pukka TukkaObservational / documentary

 Body Story Brainiac Celebrity Gogglebox USA (2020)
 Cops (1991-2010 on TEN, 2011–2020 on 10 Bold)
 David Attenborough: Animal Attraction David Attenborough Specials (10, 10 Bold, Now on Nine/ABC)
 Deadliest Catch
 Crazy About One Direction
 Unsolved Mysteries (originally aired on Seven)
 Attenborough's Ark
 Giant Otters of the Amazon
 Living with Baboons
 One Strange Rock (2019)
 Operation Iceberg
 Snow Babies

Game shows

 Are You Smarter Than a 5th Grader?
 Don't Forget the Lyrics!
 Identity
 Jeopardy! (2008–2009 series only, on One, Now on SBS)
 Scavengers
 Studs

Anthology

 American Gothic
 FBI: The Untold Stories
 The Hitchhiker
 The Jim Henson Hour
 The Magical World of Disney
 The Wonderful World of Disney

Children's

 The Abbott and Costello Cartoon Show (originally aired on Seven, later aired on ABC)
 Action Man (1995)
 Action Man (CGI, 2000)
 The Adventures of Chuck and Friends
 The Adventures of Hyperman
 The Adventures of Jimmy Neutron: Boy Genius
 The Adventures of Rin Tin Tin
 The Adventures of Sam and Max: Freelance Police
 Adventures of Sonic the Hedgehog
 The Adventures of T-Rex
 The Adventures of Teddy Ruxpin
 Alias the Jester (originally aired on ABC)
 Alien Racers
 All Grown Up!
 All-New Dennis the Menace
 The Amazing Spiez!
 Atrezzo
 The All-New Pink Panther Show (later aired on Seven)
 Alvin and the Chipmunks (Ruby-Spears version, Murakami Wolf Swenson/DIC Entertainment version later aired on ABC)
 The Alvin Show (originally aired on ABC, later aired on Seven)
 The Amazing 3
 Anne of Green Gables: The Animated Series
 The Ant and the Aardvark
 Aquaman
 Archie's TV Funnies
 Astro Boy (1960s version only in Melbourne)
 Attack of the Killer Tomatoes
 Avatar: The Last Airbender (originally aired on ABC)
 The Avengers: United They Stand
 B-Daman Crossfire
 Back to the Future
 Bad Dog
 Baggy Pants and the Nitwits
 Bailey Kipper's P.O.V.
 Bakugan Battle Brawlers
 Bakugan: Gundalian Invaders
 Bakugan: Mechtanium Surge
 Bakugan: New Vestroia
 Barbie: Life in the Dreamhouse
 Barney & Friends (originally aired on Nine, only aired on Ten from 1997 to 1998, returned to air on Nine in 2000, later aired on ABC Kids in 2003)
 Batfink (later aired on ABC Kids, ABC and ABC2)
 Batman with Robin the Boy Wonder
 Battle of the Planets (later aired on ABC)
 Beakman's World (sometimes shares with Nine)
 The Beatles
 Beethoven
 The Berenstain Bears
 Beverly Hills Teens
 Beyblade
 Beyblade G-Revolution
 Beyblade: Metal Fury
 Beyblade: Metal Fusion
 Beyblade: Metal Masters
 Beyblade: Shogun Steel
 Beyblade V-Force
 BeyWheelz
 Big Bad Beetleborgs
 Big Time Rush (2020–21)
 Biker Mice from Mars (1993)
 Biker Mice From Mars (2006)
 Bionic Six
 Blazing Team: Masters of Yo-Kwon-Do
 Blue Peter
 The Blue Racer
 Bobby's World
 The Brady Kids
 Bratz
 Bruno the Kid
 Bucky O'Hare and the Toad Wars
 Bugs and Daffy's Carnival of the Animals
 Bugs Bunny and Friends
 The Bugs Bunny Show (originally aired on Nine, sometimes airs on Seven in Sydney)
 Bugs Bunny's Looney Christmas Tales (later aired on Nine)
 Bugs Bunny's Thanksgiving Diet
 Bureau of Alien Detectors
 Button Nose
 Butt-Ugly Martians
 C.A.B.
 C.O.P.S. (originally aired on Nine)
 Cadillacs and Dinosaurs
 Calvin and the Colonel
 Capitol Critters
 Captain Simian and the Space Monkeys
 Captain Zed and the Zee Zone
 Capt'n Sailorbird
 Cardcaptors
 Cardfight!! Vanguard (2018 series)
 Cardfight!! Vanguard G
 Cardfight!! Vanguard G: GIRS Crisis
 Cardfight!! Vanguard G: NEXT
 Cardfight!! Vanguard G: Stride Gate
 The Care Bears
 Care Bears: Welcome to Care-a-Lot
 Cartoon All-Stars to the Rescue (Simulcast with Seven Network & Nine Network) 
 Casper and Friends
 Casper the Friendly Ghost
 The Centurions
 Challenge of the Super Friends
 Chaotic
 Chucklewood Critters
 Clue (mini-series)
 Cockleshell Bay
 Code Lyoko
 Commander Crumbcake
 Conan the Adventurer
 Cool McCool
 A Cosmic Christmas (originally aired on ABC)
 Count Duckula (originally aired on ABC, later aired on 7TWO)
 Courageous Cat and Minute Mouse
 Crackerjack
 Creepy Crawlers
 Crusader Rabbit (originally aired on Seven)
 Crush Gear
 Danger Mouse (originally aired on ABC, later aired on 7TWO)
 Dastardly and Muttley in Their Flying Machines (originally aired on Nine, later aired on Seven)
 Dennis and Gnasher (later aired on GO!)
 Dennis the Menace (1986) (originally aired on ABC)
 Digimon Adventure
 Digimon Adventure 02
 Digimon Frontier
 Digimon Tamers
 Dink, the Little Dinosaur
 Dinofroz
 Dinosaur King
 Dofus
 Dog City
 Donkey Kong Country
 Dork Hunters from Outer Space
 Doug (1991–1994 version)
 Dragon Ball GT
 Dragon Ball Z (Funimation/Saban dub)
 Dragon Flyz
 Dragon's Lair
 The Drakers
 Dr. Fad
 Droids (also airs on Nine in Perth)
 Duel Masters (later aired on Seven)
 The Dukes
 Dungeons & Dragons (originally aired on Seven)
 Eagle Riders
 Earthworm Jim
 Eek! and the Terrible Thunderlizards
 Eek! The Cat
 Eekstravaganza
 The Electric Company (later aired on ABC and SBS)
 Eon Kid
 Ewoks
 Exosquad
 Extreme Dinosaurs
 Extreme Ghostbusters
 Fables of the Green Forest
 The Fairly OddParents (originally aired on ABC, later aired on ABC ME)
 Fangface
 Fantastic Four (1978 series)
 Fantastic Four (1994 series)
 Fantomcat
 Fat Albert and the Cosby Kids
 Felix the Cat (originally aired on ABC, shares with Seven)
 Fievel's American Tails
 The Flintstones (originally aired on Seven, sometimes airs on Nine, returned to air on Seven later during the mid 1970s)
 Fraggle Rock (later aired on ABC, ABC1 and ABC2)
 Fudge
 Funky Fables
 The Funny Company
 Gadget and the Gadgetinis
 Gadget Boy and Heather
 Garfield and Friends
 George of the Jungle
 Geronimo Stilton
 The Ghost of Faffner Hall
 Gigantor
 Gilligan's Planet
 Godzilla
 GGO Football
 GoGoRiki
 Goldie Gold and Action Jack
 Goober and the Ghost Chasers
 Goosebumps
 Gophers!
 Gormiti: The Lords of Nature Return
 Gormiti Nature Unleashed
 The Great Space Coaster
 Groovie Goolies (shares with Seven and Nine)
 Hamtaro
 Hanazuki: Full of Treasures
 Hans Christian Andersen
 Harvey Beaks (2020–21)
 He-Man and the Masters of the Universe (2002 series)
 Heathcliff
 Heckle and Jeckle
 Hector Heathcote
 Here Comes the Grump
 Hero: 108
 The Hilarious House of Frightenstein
 Hoppity Hooper
 Horseland
 Hot Wheels
 Hot Wheels Battle Force 5
 How to Rock (2021–22)
 Hulk Hogan's Rock 'n' Wrestling
 Hunter Street (2020)
 Huntik: Secrets & Seekers
 I Am Frankie (2021)
 I Am the Greatest: The Adventures of Muhammad Ali
 The Incredible Hulk (1982)
 Inspector Gadget (originally aired on ABC)
 Invader Zim
 Iron Man
 Jackie Chan Adventures
 The Jackson 5ive
 Jamie and the Magic Torch (originally aired on ABC)
 Jem
 Joe 90
 Johnny Cypher in Dimension Zero
 Jonny Quest (later aired on Seven)
 Journey to the Center of the Earth
 Julius Jr.
 Jumanji
 The Kids from Room 402
 King Arthur and the Knights of Justice
 The King Kong Show
 King Leonardo and his Short Subjects (originally aired on ABC, later aired on Seven and Nine)
 Kum-Kum
 Lalaloopsy
 Land of the Lost (1974)
 Lassie
 A Laurel and Hardy Cartoon (originally aired on ABC)
 Legend of the Dragon
 Linus the Lionhearted
 Little Mouse on the Prairie
 The Little Vampire
 Little Wizards
 The Littles (originally aired on Nine)
 The Littlest Hobo
 The Littl' Bits
 The Lone Ranger Cartoon
 Looney Tunes (usually airs on Nine)
 The Magic of Herself the Elf
 The Magic School Bus (later aired on ABC Kids and ABC)
 The Magical World of Gigi
 Magilla Gorilla (later aired on Nine and Seven)
 Marine Boy (sometimes shares with Nine)
 The Marvel Action Hour
 M.A.S.K. (originally aired on Nine)
 Matt Hatter Chronicles
 Max Steel (2000 series)
 Medabots
 MegaMan NT Warrior
 Men in Black: The Series
 Merrie Melodies (usually airs on Nine)
 Mew Mew Power (moved to Boomerang Australia)
 The Mighty Hercules
 Mighty Man and Yukk
 Mighty Mouse
 Mighty Mouse and Friends
 Milton the Monster
 Mission: Magic!
 Misterjaw
 A Monster Christmas
 A Monster Easter
 Monster Force
 Monster High
 Monster Rancher
 Moon Jumper
 Mr. T
 Mrs. Piggle-Wiggle
 Muppet Babies
 My Life as a Teenage Robot
 My Little Pony: Friendship Is Magic (Now on 9Go!)
 My Secret Identity
 Naruto (Season 1 only)
 The New Adventures of Batman
 The New Adventures of Gilligan
 The New Adventures of Speed Racer
 The New Adventures of Superman
 The New Archies (originally aired on Nine)
 The New Fantastic Four
 The New Three Stooges
 The New Woody Woodpecker Show
 Ninja Turtles: The Next Mutation
 Ojamajo Doremi
 One Piece (2006–2008)
 OWL/TV
 Pac-Man and the Ghostly Adventures
 Paradise Café (2011–13)
 The Penguins of Madagascar (moved to ABC ME)
 Pet Alien
 Peter Pan and the Pirates
 Piggsburg Pigs!
 Pink Panther and Sons
 The Pink Panther Show (later aired on Seven)
 Pitfall!
 The Plastic Man Comedy/Adventure Show
 Pokémon (Season 1–19, 1998–2012 on TEN, 2012–2018 on ELEVEN, moved to 9Go!)
 Popeye
 The Porky Pig Show (originally aired on Nine, sometimes airs on Seven in Sydney)
 Pound Puppies (1986) (Victoria only, originally aired on Seven)
 Prezzemolo
 Prince Planet
 Problem Child
 Project G.e.e.K.e.R.
 Puppy in My Pocket: Adventures in Pocketville
 The Puppy's New Adventures
 Rainbow (also airs on Seven and Nine)
 Rainbow Brite
 Rarg
 The Real Ghostbusters (later aired on Nine)
 Red Planet
 Redakai: Conquer the Kairu
 Rekkit Rabbit
 The Ren & Stimpy Show
 Rentaghost
 Rescue Heroes
 Rickety Rocket
 Roboroach
 Robotech (later aired on Seven)
 Rocket Power (later aired on ABC3)
 Rocky and Bullwinkle (originally aired on Nine, was later aired again on Nine and later on Seven and ABC)
 Rod Rocket
 RollBots	
 Rubik, the Amazing Cube
 Rude Dog and the Dweebs
 Rugrats (later aired on ABC3)
 Sailor Moon (originally aired on Seven, DIC Dub)
 The Savage Dragon
 Scan2Go
 Scaredy Squirrel
 Scruffy
 The Secret Files of the Spy Dogs
 The Secret Lives of Waldo Kitty (usually airs on Nine)
 Shazam!
 Shelley Duvall's Bedtime Stories
 The Shirley Temple Show
 Sidekick
 Silver Surfer
 Sinbad Jr. and his Magic Belt (originally aired on ABC)
 Skeleton Warriors
 Sky Dancers
 Skyhawks
 Slugterra
 Sonic X
 Space Academy
 Space Ace (manga)
 Space Ace (Saturday Supercade cartoon)
 Space Angel
 Space Ghost (originally aired on Nine, later aired on Seven)
 Space Goofs
 Space Sentinels
 The Spectacular Spider-Man	
 Speed Racer (originally aired on ABC, later aired on Seven, ABC Kids and ABC2)
 Spider-Man (1967 series)
 Spider-Man (1981 series)	
 Spider-Man: The Animated Series
 Spider-Man Unlimited
 Spider-Woman
 The Spooktacular New Adventures of Casper
 Star Wars: Clone Wars (2003)
 Star Wars: The Clone Wars (2008); Season 1 only; later moved to ABC3)
 Steel Riders
 The Storyteller (later aired on ABC)
 Strawberry Shortcake
 Street Sharks
 Stuart Little: The Animated Series
 Super Friends
 Super President
 Superhuman Samurai Syber-Squad
 Superior Defender Gundam Force
 Take Hart
 Tales from the Cryptkeeper
 Tarzan, Lord of the Jungle
 Teenage Mutant Ninja Turtles (1987 series) (2013–21)
 Teenage Mutant Ninja Turtles (2003 series) (moved to Boomerang Australia)
 Teenage Mutant Ninja Turtles (2012 series) (moved to ABC ME)
 Teknoman
 Tenko and the Guardians of the Magic
 Tennessee Tuxedo and His Tales
 Thundarr the Barbarian (later aired on Seven)
 Thunder
 Thunderbirds (usually airs on Nine)
 ThunderCats (1985) (Victoria only, originally aired on Seven in Sydney in 1986, didn't air on Seven in Victoria until 1989)
 The Tick
 Tickety Toc
 The Tomfoolery Show
 Top Cat (airs only in Adelaide, originally aired on Nine, later aired on Seven)
 Totally Spies! (2005–2008 on Ten, 2018–present on 10 Peach)
 Transformers
 Transformers: Animated
 Transformers: Armada
 Transformers: Cybertron
 Transformers: Energon
 Transformers: Generation 2
 Transformers: Prime (miniseries) (moved to Boomerang Australia)
 Transformers: Robots in Disguise (2001 series)
 Transformers: Robots in Disguise (2015 series)
 Travellers by Night
 Treasure Island
 Trollz
 Turbo Teen
 Underdog
 Vid Kids
 Viva Piñata
 Vor-Tech: Undercover Conversion Squad
 VR Troopers	
 Wacky Races (originally aired on Nine, later aired on Seven)
 Wake, Rattle, and Roll
 Walter Melon
 Watch Mr. Wizard
 We All Have Tales
 What's New, Mr. Magoo?
 Where on Earth Is Carmen Sandiego?
 WildC.A.T.S.
 Willow Town
 Wing Commander Academy	
 Winx Club (now on GO!)
 WITS Academy (2021)
 The Wizard of Oz
 Wizards
 Wyatt Earp
 X-Men
 Xiaolin Chronicles
 Yogi's Gang (usually airs on Seven)
 Yu-Gi-Oh! (Moved on 9Go!)
 Yu-Gi-Oh! 5D's
 Yu-Gi-Oh! GX
 Zoids (Cheez TV was the first Western station to air the final four episodes of the Zoids: Chaotic Century series in its English language version)
 Zoids: Chaotic Century
 Zorro: Generation Z

Preschool

 Bernard (2018)
 Care Bears and Cousins
 Dinosaur Train (later aired on ABC Kids)
 Fresh Beat Band of Spies (2020–21)
 Littlest Pet Shop (2012 series)
 Maya the Bee
 Mia and Me
 Pound Puppies (2010 series)
 Super Wings (later aired on 9Go!)
 Strawberry Shortcake's Berry Bitty Adventures
 Transformers: Rescue Bots (2015–16, 2021)	
 Tree Fu Tom (later aired on ABC Kids)

Sports

American football: NFL, Super Bowl (2009–2014)
Baseball: Major League Baseball including Postseason, World Series (2009-2013)
Basketball: NBA (1993-1999, 2008-2011)
Cricket: Indian Premier League (2008-2010), Champions League Twenty20 (2009-2010, 2013)
Golf: U.S. Open, U.S. Masters, Ryder Cup
Motor Racing: NASCAR
WWE (1997–2000) now on FOX8 & 9Go!

Annual events
 Grammy Awards (2021)
 Primetime Emmy Awards (now on Fox8)
 Teen Choice Awards

Religious

 Bayless Conley
 Christian City TV
 Crossing Over with John Edward
 Hillsong
 Jesus Television
 Kenneth Copeland
 Key of David
 Life Today with James Robison (now on 7flix)
 This is Your Day with Benny Hinn

Other

 Around Midnight
 Australian Property Hotspots
 Bread
 Cactus Garden
 Chilli Factor
 Closer Look With Kevin Trudeau
 Cool Aid
 Creative Living
 Danoz
 Discover Down Under
 Drive Safe
 Feds: The War Against Crime
 Free TV
 Good Sex
 Guinness World Records
 In Entertainment
 In History's Page
 Kenny's World Tour Of Toilets
 Medical Investigation
 Nolan & Owen
 Outback Stripper
 Swami Sarasvati (Sydney only)
 Switched on Living (Sydney only)
 What The Hell Just Happened? (2021)
 What The Hell Happens Next? (2021)
 Why Dig That Up!
 Wild Weekends
 A Year to Remember
 Yoga TV
 Zoo
 Zoo Babies With Whoopi Goldberg

See also

 List of programs broadcast by ABC Television
 List of programs broadcast by Nine Network
 List of programs broadcast by Special Broadcasting Service
 List of programs broadcast by Seven Network
 List of Australian television series

Notes

References

External links

Network Ten

Network 10
Network Ten